Erwin Strahl (12 February 1929 – 20 April 2011) was an Austrian actor. From 1966 until his death, he was married to Austrian actress Waltraut Haas.

He died on 20 April 2011 at the age of 82.

Filmography

References

External links
 

1929 births
2011 deaths
Austrian male film actors
Austrian male television actors
Male actors from Vienna
20th-century Austrian male actors